Million Wolde (Amharic: ሚሊዮን ወልዴ; born March 17, 1979) is an Ethiopian athlete, winner of the 5000 metres at the 2000 Summer Olympics.

At the age of only seventeen, Million Wolde competed in the 1996 World Junior Championships in Sydney, finishing sixth in the 3000 m steeplechase. At the next World Junior Championships, at Annecy, France in 1998, he won the 5000 m. He also finished eighth in the Junior World Cross-Country Championships at Cape Town in 1996, gained second place at Turin in 1997 and at Marrakech, in 1998, he won his final junior championships over 8 km. On the road, Wolde represented Ethiopia in the 1998 World Road Relay Championships at Manaus, Brazil. Ethiopia eventually finished second to Kenya, after Wolde had established a narrow lead in the initial 5 km leg.

But the real fame came, when Wolde won the bronze medal in the 3000 metres at the World Indoor Championships at Maebashi in 1999 and then finished eighth in the 5000 m at the World Championships in Seville later that year. At the World Cross-Country Championships, Wolde finished fourth in the senior men's short course (4 km) at Belfast in 1999 and fifteenth at the same distance in Vilamoura, Portugal in 2000.

The highlight of Wolde's career came in the 5000 m at the 2000 Sydney Olympic Games, when he was still just twenty two. With no one prepared to set a decent pace, Wolde bided his time and then sprinted past the leaders with 200 m remaining to win in 13:35.49 ahead of second placed Ali Saïdi-Sief of Algeria and Morocco's Brahim Lahlafi. At the next World Championships in Edmonton, Canada, Wolde won a silver medal in 5000 m.

Injuries have hampered his career during recent years, but he was still active . As of 2015, he lives in Tarrytown, NY and has participated in several local races. As of August 2018, Million is an Assistant Cross Country coach at Saint Thomas Academy in Mendota Heights, MN.

References

1979 births
Living people
Ethiopian male long-distance runners
Ethiopian male steeplechase runners
Athletes (track and field) at the 2000 Summer Olympics
Olympic athletes of Ethiopia
Olympic gold medalists for Ethiopia
World Athletics Championships medalists
World Athletics Championships athletes for Ethiopia
Medalists at the 2000 Summer Olympics
Olympic gold medalists in athletics (track and field)
21st-century Ethiopian people